Crazy Jane is a fictional character, a comic book superhero appearing in publications by DC Comics. Created by writer Grant Morrison and artist Richard Case, the character first appeared in Doom Patrol (vol. 2) #19 (February 1989), which was published by the DC imprint Vertigo Comics. She suffers from dissociative identity disorder as a result of childhood trauma, and each one of her 64 alternate personalities, or "alters", has a unique superhuman ability. According to the afterword in the first trade paperback collection of Morrison's run on Doom Patrol, she was based on Truddi Chase'se autobiography, When Rabbit Howls, which Morrison has been reading while creating the series.

Jane is portrayed by Diane Guerrero in the TV series Doom Patrol on HBO Max along with Skye Roberts portraying Kay Challis.

Fictional character biography
Jane Morris is the current dominant alter, or host, of Kay Challis's system (used to refer to every alter someone has as a collective). Kay Challis, as a result of repeated childhood trauma, developed dissociative identity disorder. Later in life, while being exposed to the alien Dominators' "gene bomb", each of her dissociative parts, or alters (which is numbered at 64), has a different super-power.

Beginning at only five years old, Kay Challis is continuously abused by her father. The first time this happens, she is putting a jigsaw puzzle together; this becomes an important symbol in her future. As the abuse continues, Kay withdraws and goes dormant, retreating to the unconscious brain. Her role as host is then taken over by an alter with the name "Miranda". One Easter Sunday while at church, Miranda is raped, which triggers several flashbacks to her former abuse. This causes the dormancy of Miranda and a massive amount of alters to be split off. She is committed to a mental institution soon after. During that time, an alien species called Dominators invade Earth and activate a device which they call their "gene bomb". When the gene bomb goes off, Jane and all of her alters are affected; each alter gains a different power (e.g., Black Annis has retractable claws, Flit can teleport, etc.).

The superhero Cliff Steele, or Robotman, suffered several losses due to this bomb. Killing many of his Doom Patrol teammates, he was struggling emotionally. While staying in the same institution as Jane, Dr. Will Magnus, creator of the group "the Metal Men", asks Cliff to look after her, which leads to Jane becoming a member of the Doom Patrol.

Near the end of the Grant Morrison run of Doom Patrol, Jane makes a pilgrimage back to her childhood home, facing her own traumas and overcoming them. This brings peace to her inner turmoil, causing her and her alters to come to an understanding and live in co-operation.

Upon returning to the Doom Patrol, Jane is attacked by the Candlemaker and thrown into another dimension, which is similar to the real world, where she is diagnosed with schizophrenia and treated with shock therapy. Cliff eventually rescues Jane from the other dimension and they relocate to Danny the World, formerly Danny the Street. In Rachel Pollack's run, it is revealed that Jane's alters still exist, which causes many arguments between the two. Cliff decides to leave her with Danny and returns to Earth.

Jane makes a cameo appearance in Teen Titans (vol. 3) #36, where she is seen on Danny the World through a portal in Dayton Manor in Prague. She returns in Doom Patrol (vol. 5) #7, written by Keith Giffen, on Oolong Island, asking for Cliff and carrying with her the remains of Danny the Street. Danny has now been reduced to a single brick, making them Danny the Brick. Jane says "If you build it, he will come", although she does not explain further.

Jane then travels around the universe along with Danny the Brick. A man named "D" then uses Danny the Brick to kill a god and causes another alter to split, or "break off". This alter starts a cult and plans to spread Crazy Jane's alters among the 63 cult members and then kill the cultists. She is stopped by the Doom Patrol, who then return Jane to the front, in order to be the host.

Jane now accepts her mental illness, no longer seeking to cure it but to cope with it and healthily coexist with her alters. Robotman also helps and accepts her disorder.

Alters
Crazy Jane's alters are organized in a mental subway grid called "the Underground," their headspace. Each alter has their own "station," which appears to serve as home when they are not in control. In the lower section of the Underground is a well where the alters can go to destroy themselves. This is where Miranda was "killed." This well houses Daddy, an alter who resembles their father, in the deepest, most protected part of the Underground. The alters consist of:

 Baby Doll: A telekinetic (rarely-seen ability) childlike alter that believes everything is lovely. It is said to be one of the few in the system that trust men.
 Baby Harlot: An integration of Baby Doll and Scarlet Harlot.
 Bizzie Lizzie Borden: Unknown.
 Black Annis: An aggressive alter equipped with sharp claws, red eyes, and blue skin. In the TV series, she stood guard over the station that held Daddy. Also misandrist, one who hates men, so she never lets any men pass her.
 Blood of the Lamb: No given information. In this form, her body is covered head to toe in blood coming from unknown (or nonexistent) wounds.
 Bubble: Not much is known about her but her name is visible on the Underground map next to Rain Brain and Lucy Fugue.
 Butterfly Baby: Constantly suffers pain on a Hellraiser-like level in the deepest part of the mind.
 Crazy Jane: The dominant alter, or "host". No apparent powers. Her name is derived from that of a character in several poems by William Butler Yeats, as well as the eponymous painting by Richard Dadd.
 Daddy: An introject of Jane's father as a giant monster made of insects, excrement, and puzzle pieces. Daddy talks with Jane's voice. It was destroyed. Resided in a mental representation of the Well where Kay was sexually assaulted by him. Has the power to shapeshift.
 Dr. Harrison: White streak of hair and blue eyes. Able to telepathically suss out the childhood traumas of others. Power to influence anyone who hears her voice. Described by Mr. Nobody as "insane". In the Underground, she's portrayed as a middle-age woman in a business suit.
 Driller Bill: A dark-skinned woman in a worker's jumpsuit. Arguably as aggressive as Hammerhead, yet also fond of Baby Doll and her antics.
 Driver 8: Conductor of the Underground subway, named after the R.E.M. song. The Driver's hat has an infinity symbol (a sideways "8") on it.
 Flaming Katy: One of the "protector" alters, protecting Jane whenever she feels threatened. Very antisocial, someone who does not like to be interrogated. She is a pyrokinetic and can fly. Also usually emerges at Baby Doll's request.
 Flit: She can teleport anywhere. Dresses in late '80s fashion.
 Hammerhead: Another protector like Flaming Katy. She is very aggressive towards everyone and possesses super-strength. In the Underground, she is bald and wears a leather jacket.
 Jack Straw: A living but mute scarecrow.
 Jeann: Unknown. Her station could be seen as Cliff was falling into Jane's mind.
 Jill-in-Irons: She is wrapped in large chains. A reference to Jack-In-Irons.
 Karen: A perky but unstable alter with the power to cast "love spells". She loves '90's rom-coms and her boyfriend, Doug. She comes out when Jane is severely depressed.
 K-5: The original host, Kay Challis, who vanished at age 5. She is "sleeping", or otherwise known as "dormant", in one of the lower stations of the Underground.
 Kit W'the Canstick: An old woman who carries a burned-out candle.
 Lady Purple: She can see the future but rarely speaks.
 Liza Radley: A stable, more "normal" appearing alter, awakened as a result of a loving environment, who pushes Jane to recovery. The other alters are unsure of how to react to Liza and feel threatened by her. She is named after a song by The Jam, the B-side of their single "Start!".
 Lucy Fugue: She has radioactive bones and see-through skin. She can also generate harmonic vibrations, a power she used to defeat the Antigod. In the live-action series, this alter has electrical powers. In the Underground, this alter is portrayed as an Asian woman with electric-blue streaks in her black beehive hairdo.
 Mama Pentecost: An expert enigma and cryptogram solver who can also translate any language.
 Merry Andrew: Dresses as a Harlequin and carries toys.
 Miranda: The former host who took over after Kay went dormant, she destroys herself after the church incident. Her "station" is now occupied by some indescribable horror, visible from a distance only as a weird light, which only Driver 8 can see without being destroyed by the vision (she covers Cliff's eyes as they pass through this area, in comic canon). Per the TV show's canon, Miranda's station is populated by noose-hung bodies and tortured souls. She miraculously returned after the Candlemaker killed Katy and Baby Doll in the Underground, and took over as primary to better ensue Kay's needs. This is later revealed to be the manifestation of depression in disguise as the real Miranda was still deceased, and her mission is to lead all personas to desperation and feeling of hopelessness, with her true goal being suicide by hang. She is defeated by Jane who, with the help of Kay and the other personas still remaining, goes up in a plane (the first way to go up before the construction of the Underground) and take control again in the exact moment Cliff stop Jane from hanging herself (in the first episode of season 3).
 No One: An aggressive persona, she was able to sense the Fifth Horseman and the Painting before it was activated.
 Penny Farthing: She speaks with a stutter when on the surface, but speaks without one in the Underground. Her job is to run. A penny farthing is the English name for the early bicycles that had different-sized wheels. In the Underground, this alter is portrayed as British woman dressed in 19th century working-class English clothes.
 Pepper's Ghost: Unknown.
 Pretty Polly: Named for the folksong, she wears a black Victorian dress and has X's carved into her eyes.
 Rain Brain: She speaks in a stream of consciousness and can take on an abstract immaterial form.
 Scarlet Harlot: A nymphomaniac with the power to create ectoplasm projections and absorb stray psychosexual energy.
 Sex Bomb: She explodes when sexually aroused.
 Silver Tongue: Her vocalizations are actualized in silver font, and can then be used as edged weapons.
 Spinning Jenny: Prone to panic attacks.
 Stigmata: She bleeds from her hands and feet and relives the church incident endlessly.
 Sun Daddy: A gigantic figure with a sun for a head with the power to throw fireballs.
 Sylvia: She bears Jane's feelings of claustrophobia. She is locked inside of a small room, reciting poem fragments. She believes if she can put the fragments together she can use them as a key out of the room. Speak in poetic dark rhythm with a spooky voice when surfaced.
 The Balladeer: After the apparent deaths of Baby Doll and Flaming Katy, she becomes a mourner to sing the ballad and led a funeral procession to the well. Her station is located in the deepest parts of the Underground that none of the other alters have ever interacted, met, and seen her before the funeral procession.
 The Engineer: He assists Driver 8 in maintaining the Underground.
 The Hangman's Beautiful Daughter: An artist with the power to psychically activate her paintings; whose name is taken from the title of an album by the Incredible String Band. She has a Frida Kahlo-esque unibrow. In the Underground, she was dressed like Frida Kahlo.
 The Nun: A Catholic nun armed with a chainsaw.
 The Pointman: He assists Driver 8 in maintaining the Underground.
 The Secretary: A neat and orderly pessimist who rarely shows emotion.
 The Shapeless Children: Constantly repeats "Daddy don' do it". She is made to constantly relive the trauma of Kay in the deepest part of the Underground.
 The Signal-Man: Another railroad-themed alter that helps maintain the Underground order. His powers are unknown.
 The Sin-Eater: She believes she must suffer for her sins. Jane brings her out as a defense when being tortured.
 The Snow Queen: She has the power to create and shape ice.
 The Wall Crawler: Unknown. She has only been seen in one of the videotapes of Dr. Caulder's interviews.
 The Weird Sisters: A three-in-one alter similar to Three Witches. Shown as a Three-Headed Lady.

There are still other 13 alters in Jane who haven't yet been properly identified. They include a red-headed girl with a beauty mark in a red dress; someone in gladiator gear; a red-headed school girl; a boy with short blonde hair; a person with an orange, odd-shaped head; and a woman whose face is shadowed over.

In other media
Jane appears in Doom Patrol, portrayed by Diane Guerrero (who also portrays Driver 8 and Karen, alongside whichever alter is in the front at any given point), Skye Roberts as a child, and Leela Owen as a teenager. In the Underground, Black Annis is performed by Helen Abell, Hammerhead is portrayed by Stephanie Czajkowski, Lucy Fugue is portrayed by Tara Lee, Penny Farthing is portrayed by Anna Lore, Pretty Polly is portrayed by Hannah Alline, Silver Tongue is portrayed by Chelsea Alana Rivera, the Secretary is portrayed by Jackie Goldston, Driller Bill is portrayed by Shay Mack, Baby Doll is portrayed by Sara Borne, the Weird Sisters are voiced and motion-captured by Monica Louwerens, Daddy is portrayed by David A. MacDonald, Balladeer is portrayed by Ana Aguilar, Miranda is portrayed by Samantha Marie Ware, and Mama Pentecost is portrayed by Va Liu. This version of Jane is the "designated driver" alter out of the 64 other alters, who prefer if she stays in control while they keep to themselves. In season two, Daddy impersonates Miranda in an attempt to gain control of the body.
 Jane also appears in the Arrowverse crossover "Crisis on Infinite Earths" via archive footage of a deleted scene from a season one episode.

See also
 Legion, a Marvel Comics character with superpowers and dissociative identity disorder.
 Stephanie Maas / Critical Mass, a character from the comic book series Rising Stars with superpowers and two "personalities".
 Moon Knight, another Marvel Comics character with supernatural superpowers and dissociative identity disorder, among other mental illnesses, who operates as a vigilante.
 Typhoid Mary, another Marvel Comics character with dissociative identity disorder, who operates as a supervillain / antihero.
 Kevin Wendell Crumb, of the 2016 film, Split, who possesses 23 "personalities" and powers.
 Two-Face (Harvey Dent), a DC Comics character with dissociative identity disorder.

References

External links
 Richard Dadd painting

DC Comics female superheroes
Fictional artists
Fictional characters with dissociative identity disorder
DC Comics metahumans
DC Comics characters who can teleport 
DC Comics characters who have mental powers
DC Comics telekinetics 
DC Comics telepaths
Comics characters introduced in 1989
Doom Patrol
Characters created by Grant Morrison
Fictional characters involved in incest
Fictional victims of child sexual abuse